Platysphinx constrigilis is a moth of the family Sphingidae first described by Francis Walker in 1869. It is known from Africa.

The length of the forewings is 55–65 mm. The ground colour of the forewings is very pale greenish brown with darker markings. There is a narrow, well defined dark streak from the costa to the centre of the outer margin. The hindwings are yellow with a large black patch at the base and two irregular parallel red bands and numerous small red spots. The underside is more greenish, less irrorated with dark scales and showing the usual sphingid pattern of parallel crenulate postdiscal and submarginal bands much more clearly than other species. Females are larger, darker and broader winged than males.

The larvae feed on Alchornea cordifolia, Baphia pubescens and Macrolobium macrophyllum.

Subspecies
Platysphinx constrigilis constrigilis (forests from Cameroon to Angola, the Congo, Uganda and western Kenya)
Platysphinx constrigilis lamtoi Pierre, 1989 (Ivory Coast)

References

Platysphinx
Moths described in 1869
Moths of Africa